Martin Raymond Peake, 2nd Viscount Ingleby (31 May 1926 – 14 October 2008) was a British peer and businessman.

Early life
Ingleby was the only son of Osbert Peake, created Viscount Ingleby in 1956, and his wife Lady Joan Capell.  He succeeded to the viscountcy on his father's death in 1966.

He was rendered a paraplegic early in life due to polio. He was educated at Eton and Trinity College, Oxford, and prior to his disability, was a lieutenant in the Coldstream Guards from 1945 to 1947. In 1955, he was called to the bar at the Inner Temple.

Marriage & children
Ingleby married Gladys Susan Landale (died 1996) in 1952, by whom he had five children:

Hon Richard Martin Herbert Peake (born 7 August 1953, died 19 July 1975)
Hon Fiona Catherine Peake (born 24 January 1955)
Hon Sarah Rachel Peake (born 27 November 1958)
Hon Henrietta Cecilia Imogen Peake (born 23 October 1961)
Hon Katharine Susan Emma Peake (born 23 December 1963)

In 1975, Ingleby suffered a personal tragedy when his only son, Richard, fell from Beachy Head and was killed.  The coroner's inquest recorded an open verdict.

After the death of his first wife in 1996, Ingleby married Dobrila Radovic in 2003. They had no children.  As Ingleby's only son predeceased him, the viscountcy became extinct on his own death in 2008.

Later life
A director of the Hargreaves Group from 1960 to 1980, Ingleby was also interested in forestry and conservation. He was a member of the planning committee for the North York Moors National Park, and was responsible for the planting of a row of lime trees at the entrance to the park, which he intended as a thanksgiving for God's deliverance of Britain during the two World Wars. He also served on the North Yorkshire County Council during the 1960s.

Ingleby and Baroness Masham, who also uses a wheelchair, took a prominent part in the House of Lords in the debate on the Disabled Persons Act 1970.

Arms

References

1926 births
2008 deaths
People educated at Eton College
Alumni of Trinity College, Oxford
Coldstream Guards officers
Members of the Inner Temple
People with paraplegia
20th-century English farmers
20th-century English landowners
Viscounts in the Peerage of the United Kingdom
Ingleby
21st-century English farmers
21st-century British landowners